Vaccinium uliginosum (bog bilberry, bog blueberry, northern bilberry or western blueberry) is a Eurasian and North American flowering plant in the genus Vaccinium within the heath family.

Distribution
Vaccinium uliginosum is native to cool temperate regions of the Northern Hemisphere, at low altitudes in the Arctic, and at high altitudes south to the Pyrenees, the Alps, and the Caucasus in Europe, the mountains of Mongolia, northern China, the Korean Peninsula and central Japan in Asia, and the Sierra Nevada in California and the Rocky Mountains in Utah in North America.

It grows on wet acidic soils on heathland, moorland, tundra, and in the understory of coniferous forests, from sea level in the Arctic, up to  altitude in the south of the range.

Description

The fruit is a dark blue-black berry   diameter, with a white flesh, edible and sweet when ripe in late summer.

Subspecies
Three subspecies have been described, but not all authorities distinguish them:
Vaccinium uliginosum subsp. microphyllum Lange – Arctic plants
Vaccinium uliginosum subsp. occidentale (A.Gray) Hultén – North American plants
Vaccinium uliginosum subsp. uliginosum

Culinary use 
The berries can be eaten raw or cooked, used to make jelly or pies, or dried to make pemmican. Bog bilberry is used in infused liquor in Korea.

References

Further reading

External links 

 Jepson Manual treatment of Vaccinium uliginosum  – flora of California.
Flora Europaea: Vaccinium uliginosum
Plants of British Columbia: Vaccinium uliginosum

uliginosum
Berries
Alpine flora
Flora of the Arctic
Flora of the Alps
Flora of Europe
Flora of temperate Asia
Flora of Canada
Flora of Greenland
Flora of the Northeastern United States
Flora of the Western United States
Flora of the Sierra Nevada (United States)
Bird food plants
Japanese fruit
Plants described in 1753
Taxa named by Carl Linnaeus
Flora without expected TNC conservation status